Lake Houston Wilderness Park is a wooded parkland that encompasses 4,786.6 acres. It is the only park owned by the Houston Parks and Recreation Department that has overnight camping and lodging. There are over 20 miles of hiking, biking, and equestrian trails available inside the park.

References

External links

 Lake Houston Wilderness Park Official Website

Parks in Houston
2006 establishments in Texas